Keep It Solid Steel Volume 1 is Mr. Scruff's first DJ mix album, recorded for Ninja Tune's Solid Steel series. According to his own site, it is the first of 4:

This first CD, of a four-part series, covers in its 74 minutes bouncy reggae, classic hip hop, deep soul, rare funk, dancefloor jazz, heavy beats and left field electronic nuggets.

Track list (CD)
 "Intro" – Mr. Scruff
 "Ing" – Mungo's Hi Fi
 "Waterhouse Rock (Groove Corporation mix)" – Big Youth
 "Black Milk" – Eight From The Egg
 "Going Way Back" – Just Ice
 "Time Machine" – Chocolate Milk
 "Flashback" – The Arsonists
 "Back In The Day" – Erykah Badu
 "My Kung Fu" – UTD
 "Ego Trippin" – Ultramagnetic MCs
 "Wrong Girls To Play With (dub)" – Papa Austin with The Great Peso
 "Tell Me How" – Sarah Winton
 "Recognition" – Demon Boyz
 "Check the Vibe" – Dred Scott
 "Funky For You" – Mark Rae vs Deadbeats
 "Dopest Verse" – Madkap
 "Disney On Acid" – 2day & 2moro / "Learn To Be Strong (acapella)" – Cappo
 "Impressions (pt.3)" – The Peddlers
 "Carrefour" – Luis Enriquez
 "Funky Axe" – Spaghetti Head
 "Highland Park" – Connie Price & The Keystones
 "Sweetie Pie" – Stone Alliance
 "Bounce Ta This" – Showbiz & AG
 "Check It" – Lords of the Underground
 "Deep Waters" – Microdisiacs
 "Searching For Mr Manuva" – Border Crossing
 "Pins & Needles" – Tipper
 "Detchibe" – Prefuse 73
 "CPU Song" – Little Miss Trinitron
 "Fairplay" – Soul II Soul
 "You Have Got To Have Freedom" – Pharoah Sanders

Track list (LP)
 "Ing" – Mungos HiFi
 "Waterhouse Rock" – Big Youth
 "Black Milk" – Eighth From The Egg
 "Ego Trippin" – Ultramagnetic MCs
 "Recognotion" – Demon Boyz
 "Bounce Ta This" – Showbiz & AG
 "Deep Waters" – Microdisiacs
 "Dopest Verse" – Madkap
 "Disney On Acid" – 2day & 2moro
 "Sweetie Pie" – Stone Alliance
 "You Have Got To Have Freedom" – Pharoah Sanders
 "Impressions (pt.3)" – The Peddlers
 "Time Machine" – Chocolate Milk
 "My Kung Fu" – UTD
 "Carrefour" – Luis Enriquez Bacalov
 "Funky Axe" – Spaghetti Head
 "Check the Vibe" – Dred Scott
 "Tell Me How" – Sarah Winton
 "Wrong Girls To Play With (dub)" – Papa Austin with The Great Peso

References

Mr. Scruff albums
DJ mix albums
2004 compilation albums
Ninja Tune compilation albums